S.E.N.S. is a Japanese new-age instrumental group formed in 1988, originally with two members. The name stands for "Sound, Earth, Nature, and Spirit" based on their spiritual policy.

They have produced many musical scores for TV dramas, documentaries, and movies in Japan, also making it into the anime scene with the score for xxxHolic.

Their albums have also been released in European and Asian countries.

In Japan, the album Tomei na Ongaku was awarded second prize for "Instrumental Album of the Year" in the 2001 Japan Gold Disc Award.。

Members
 Akihiko Fukaura: Keyboards and programming
 Yukari Katsuki: Vocal, piano and programming

Works

TV drama 
Gorilla – Keishicho Sousadaihappan (ゴリラ・警視庁捜査第８班 / 1989)
Chushingura – TBS 40th anniversary drama (忠臣蔵 – TBS開局40周年記念ドラマ / 1990)
Turn Around and That Guy'll Be There (振り返れば奴がいる / 1993)
Asunaro Hakusho (あすなろ白書 / 1993)
Deatta Koro No Kimi De Ite (出逢った頃の君でいて / 1994)
Kagayaku Kisetsu No Nakade (輝く季節の中で / 1995)
Mrs. Cinderella (ミセスシンデレラ / 1997)
Aoi Tori (青い鳥 Blue Bird / 1997)
Kamisama, Mo Sukoshi Dake (神様、もう少しだけ God, Just a Little More / 1998)
Sotsugyo Ryoko (卒業旅行 / 1999)
P.S. Genki desu, Shunpei (P.S. 元気です、俊平 P.S. I'm Fine, Shunpei / 1999)
Nisen-nen no Koi (二千年の恋 Love 2000 / 2000)
Yanagibashi Bojou (柳橋慕情 / 2000)
MARIA (マリア / 2001)
Beautiful Days (美しき日々 / 2001)
Satomi Hakken Den – TBS 50th anniversary project (里見八犬伝 / 2006)
Yakusya Damashii! (役者魂！ / 2006)
Last Friends (ラストフレンズ / 2008)
Aishiteru – Kaiyo (アイシテル – 海容 / 2008)
Tenshi no dairinin (天使の代理人 / 2010)
Aishiteru – Kizuna (アイシテル – 絆 / 2011)
Kyogu – ABC 60th anniversary special drama (境遇 – ABC創立60周年記念スペシャルドラマ / 2011)
Yoake No lullaby (夜明けのララバイ / 2012)
Boku no Natsuyasumi (僕の夏休み / 2012)
Ao No Umi – LONG SUMMER - (碧の海 – LONG SUMMER –  / 2014)
Sparrow (麻雀 / 2016 / Chinese drama)
The Glory of Tang Dynasty (大唐荣耀 / 2017)
The Advisors Alliance (大军师司马懿之军师联盟 / 2017)
Totto-Chan ! (トットちゃん！/2017)
Growling Tiger, Roaring Dragon (虎嘯龍吟/2017)
The Smiling, Proud Wanderer (新笑傲江湖/2018)

TV documentary 
NHK Special Umi No Silk Road (NHK特集 海のシルクロード / 1988)
NHK Special Chikyu Osen (NHK特集 地球汚染 / 1989)
NHK Special Ningen Ha Nani Wo Tabetekita Ka (NHKスペシャル 人間は何を食べてきたか / 1900)
MBS 40th anniversary Program Shin Beagle-Go Tankenki (MBS40周年記念番組 新ビーグル号探検記 New Beagle Explorational Journal / 1991)TBS Yomigaeru Ougon No Miyako Shikan (TBS 蘇る黄金の都シカン / 1994)TBS 40th Anniversary Special Project – Nihonkai Daikikou (TBS40周年特別企画 日本海大紀行 / 1995)NHK Special Kokyu – Shihou Ga Kataru Chuka Gosen-nen - (NHKスペシャル 故宮 – 至宝が語る中華五千年 – / 1996)NHK  Kokyo No Shihou (NHK 故宮の至宝 / 1997)TBS The 21st Century Project Kokyu Daiensei – Chugoku Koutei No Hihou 10,000 km No Tabi (TBS21世紀プロジェクト 故宮大遠征 – 中国皇帝の秘宝 – 10000キロの旅 / 1999)NHK Nippon Kawa Kikou (NHK にっぽん川紀行 / 1998)NHK Asia Ningen Kaidou (NHK アジア人間街道 / 2001)FujiTV Echika No Kagami – Kokoro Ni Kiku TV - (フジテレビ系 エチカの鏡 – ココロにキクTV – /2008 – 2009)NHK ASIAN PASSION – Asia Wo Kakeru Nihonjin – (NHK ASIAN PASSION – アジアを駆ける日本人 – / 2010 – )NHK Umi To Ikiru (NHK 海と生きる / 2013)NHK Gurutto Setouchi No Tabi (NHK ぐるっと瀬戸内の旅 / 2013)Roof of the World (中国CCTV 第三极 / 2015)The Land of Spirits (中国bilibili 众神之地 / 2022)

 TV commercial Onward Kashiyama – KUMIKYOKU - (オンワード樫山 – 組曲 – / 1993, 1998)Sagami  – I,KIMONO - (さが美 – I,KIMONO – / 1994, 1995)KIRIN Seagram – Chivas Regal - (キリンシーグラム – シーバスリーガル – / 1995)Ajinomoto – Company Commercial - (味の素 企業CM / 2000)J-PHONE Tokai (J-PHONE 東海 / 2001)KATAOKA – MON CAFE - (片岡物産 MON CAFE / 2003, 2004)Tokyo Gas – company commercial - (東京ガス 企業CM / 2005)Take and Give. Needs – House Wedding - (テイクアンドギヴ・ニーズ ハウスウェディング / 2005, 2006)Kibun – Osechi - (紀文 おせち料理 / 2005, 2006, 2007)

 Movie A City of Sadness (悲情城市 / 1989)Ichigensan (いちげんさん / 2000)All About My Dog series ( いぬのえいがシリーズ / 2005, 2011)Shissou (疾走 / 2005)Mezamashi TV Nyanko The Movie (めざましテレビ にゃんこ THE MOVIE / 2006)Shikyuu No Kioku Koko Ni Anata Ga Iru (子宮の記憶 ここにあなたがいる / 2007)Mezamashi TV Nyanko The Movie 2 (めざましテレビ にゃんこ THE MOVIE 2 / 2007)Crossing Over (日中合作映画 鳳凰 わが愛 / 2007 / Japan and China collaboration movie)Mezamashi TV Nyanko The Movie 3 (めざましテレビ にゃんこ THE MOVIE 3 / 2009)Mezamashi TV Nyanko The Movie 4 (めざましテレビ にゃんこ THE MOVIE 4 / 2010)The Warring States  (日中韓合作映画 戦国 / 2011 / Japan, China, and Korea collaboration movie)
 Little Ghostly Adventures of the Tofu Boy (豆富小僧 Tōfu Kozō / 2011)Mezamashi TV Nyanko The Movie 5 (めざましテレビ にゃんこ THE MOVIE 5 / 2012)Time Raiders (中国映画 盗墓筆記 タイム・レイダース / 2016 / Chinese Movie)Born in 2000 (中国映画 零零后 / 2019 / Chinese Movie)

 TV animation The Wonderful Galaxy of Oz (スペースオズの冒険 / 1992)KURAU Phantom Memory (2004)
 xxxHolic (×××HOLiC / 2006)
 xxxHolic: Kei (×××HOLiC◆継 / 2008)Genji Monogatari Sennenki (源氏物語千年紀 Genji / 2009)Kimi ni Todoke (君に届け / 2009)Kimi ni Todoke 2nd Season (君に届け 2ND SEASON / 2011)Dededen (西武鉄道100周年、トムス・エンタテインメント50周年記念 – でででん – / 2015)My Love Story!! (俺物語!! / 2015)Space Battleship Yamato 2202: Warriors of Love Ending Song of Chapter 2～6 (「宇宙戦艦ヤマト2202 愛の戦士たち」第二～六章 エンディング主題歌 / 2017～2018)

 Others 
Stage Drama – Kaijin Bessou – (舞台 – 海神別荘 – / 1994)– KENZO collection – Music Produce (KENZOコレクション / 音楽プロデュース / 1997)
– Koibumi / Hiroko Yakushimaru – Produce (薬師丸ひろ子 – 恋文 – / 音楽プロデュース / 1997)Tokyo Dome – Colosseum 2000 – Theme Song (東京ドーム – コロシアム2000 – テーマ曲 / 2000)Beijing Olympics – Opening Theme of Unveiling ceremony of Symbol (北京オリンピックシンボルマーク除幕式オープニングテーマ / 2003)– I'm Remembering Me / Hanayo – Produce (花世 – I'm Remembering Me – / プロデュース / 2005)– Bokura no Ao Setouchi no Uta / Ayaka Hirahara – Produce'' (平原綾香 – 僕らの青~ 瀬戸内の詩 ~ / プロデュース / 2013)

Discography

Singles

Albums

Other project singles

Other project albums

Awards
 Venezia International Festival of Film Grand Prix (1989)
 The 8th Japan Gold Disc Grand-Prix Album Award (Instrumental) (1994)
 The 15th Japan Gold Disc Grand-Prix Award of the year (Instrumental) (2001)

See also
 Kitaro, a Japanese new-age composer

References

External links
 

Anime composers
Japanese electronic musicians
Japanese film score composers
Musical groups established in 1988
New-age music groups